"A Certain Girl" is a rhythm and blues song written by Allen Toussaint, with the credit listed under his pen name Naomi Neville. New Orleans R&B singer Ernie K-Doe recorded it in 1961.  Minit Records released the song as the B-side of "I Cried My Last Tear".

The single became a double-sided hit on Billboard magazine's Hot 100 record chart, with "A Certain Girl" reaching number 71 (and "I Cried My Last Tear" number 69) during on December 4, 1961.  Neither song appeared on Billboard's Hot R&B sides chart.

Over the years, K-Doe's original "A Certain Girl" has been included on several compilations and a variety of musicians have recorded versions of the song.

The Yardbirds rendition

Background
"A Certain Girl" was one of the first songs recorded by English rock band the Yardbirds.  At the time, the group were a part of the early British rhythm and blues scene that produced bands such as the Rolling Stones and drew their repertoire from American blues and rhythm and blues artists such as Muddy Waters, Howlin' Wolf, and Bo Diddley.  They had heard K-Doe's song on a London Records compilation album featuring Minit Records R&B artists titled We Sing the Blues (1963).

Recording and release
With Eric Clapton on lead guitar, the Yardbirds first attempted a recording in January 1964 at the R. G. Jones Studios, Surrey, England. A 12-inch acetate demo (co-produced by Mike Vernon) was pressed for an EMI audition  (released on the Yardbirds anthologies Train Kept A-Rollin' – The Complete Giorgio Gomelsky Productions (1993) and Glimpses 1963–1968 (2011)).

In March 1964, a second attempt was made at Olympic Studios in London that yielded the master recording.  Produced by manager Giorgio Gomelsky, the song was planned as the A-side for the Yardbirds' first single; however, their version of "I Wish You Would" (recorded during the same session) was used instead, with "A Certain Girl" becoming the B-side.  The single was released by EMI subsidiary Columbia Graphophone Company in May 1964.  In August, Epic Records released the single in the US, but it failed to chart (both songs were included on the Yardbirds' first Epic album For Your Love (1965)).

Reception
Although "A Certain Girl" is a brief 2:15, Clapton manages a nearly half-minute guitar solo that Gomelsky describes as a "fat and fuzzy guitar riff". Yardbirds biographer Alan Clayson compared it to "high-velocity flash... his break has almost a separate life from the rest of the number."  Yardbirds drummer Jim McCarty felt that the song was "too clean, too sparkling and it even had a hint of 'novelty song'" perhaps due to Gomelsky's production and the repeated "yeah" interjections.  In his autobiography, Clapton described the early recordings as sounding "pretty lame. We just sounded young and white... I felt just that we were falling short of the mark in some way."  However, music journalist Cub Koda was more indulging: "If you can get past the Andy Hardy backups, you have a pretty catchy ditty [that] must have caught the ears of Warren Zevon".  Future Yardbird Jimmy Page provided the lead guitar for a 1964 version by English group the First Gear (included on Jimmy Page: Session Man, Vol. 1 (1989)).

Versions by other artists
Warren Zevon recorded "A Certain Girl" in 1980, with Jackson Browne on backing vocals.  Released as a single from his album, Bad Luck Streak in Dancing School, it reached number 57 on the Hot 100 and number 57 on the Cash Box Top 100.  In Canada, it reached number 61.  Record World called it a "a hot rocker" and said that "Waddy Wachtel provides the guitar sparks and the Jackson Browne/Rick Marotta chorus is cute & catchy."

The song's writer Allen Toussaint performed the song as a part of a medley of some of his hits in the 2005 documentary film Make It Funky!. It presents a history of New Orleans music and its influence on rhythm and blues, rock and roll, funk and jazz.

References

Sources

External links

: List of the Yardbirds single releases

1961 songs
1961 singles
1964 singles
1980 singles
Songs written by Allen Toussaint
Minit Records singles
Columbia Graphophone Company singles
Epic Records singles
Asylum Records singles
The Yardbirds songs
Warren Zevon songs